

Events

Pre-1600
1303 – The Sapienza University of Rome is instituted by a bull of Pope Boniface VIII.

1601–1900
1653 – Oliver Cromwell dissolves England's Rump Parliament.
1657 – English Admiral Robert Blake destroys a Spanish silver fleet, under heavy fire from the shore, at the Battle of Santa Cruz de Tenerife.
  1657   – Freedom of religion is granted to the Jews of New Amsterdam (later New York City).
1752 – Start of Konbaung–Hanthawaddy War, a new phase in the Burmese Civil War (1740–57).
1770 – The Georgian king, Erekle II, abandoned by his Russian ally Count Totleben, wins a victory over Ottoman forces at Aspindza.
1775 – American Revolutionary War: The Siege of Boston begins, following the battles at Lexington and Concord.
1789 – George Washington arrives at Grays Ferry, Philadelphia, while en route to Manhattan for his inauguration.
1792 – France declares war against the "King of Hungary and Bohemia", the beginning of the French Revolutionary Wars.
1800 – The Septinsular Republic is established.
1809 – Two Austrian army corps in Bavaria are defeated by a First French Empire army led by Napoleon at the Battle of Abensberg on the second day of a four-day campaign that ended in a French victory.
1828 – René Caillié becomes the second non-Muslim to enter Timbuktu, following Major Gordon Laing. He would also be the first to return alive.
1836 – U.S. Congress passes an act creating the Wisconsin Territory.
1861 – American Civil War: Robert E. Lee resigns his commission in the United States Army in order to command the forces of the state of Virginia.
  1861   – Thaddeus S. C. Lowe, attempting to display the value of balloons, makes record journey, flying 900 miles from Cincinnati to South Carolina. 
1862 – Louis Pasteur and Claude Bernard complete the experiment disproving the theory of spontaneous generation.
1865 – Astronomer Angelo Secchi demonstrates the Secchi disk, which measures water clarity, aboard Pope Pius IX's yacht, the L'Immaculata Concezion.
1876 – The April Uprising begins. Its suppression shocks European opinion, and Bulgarian independence becomes a condition for ending the Russo-Turkish War.
1884 – Pope Leo XIII publishes the encyclical Humanum genus, condemning Freemasonry.
1898 – U.S. President William McKinley signs a joint resolution to Congress for declaration of war against Spain, beginning the Spanish–American War.

1901–present
1902 – Pierre and Marie Curie refine radium chloride.
1914 – Nineteen men, women, and children participating in a strike are killed in the Ludlow Massacre during the Colorado Coalfield War.
1918 – Manfred von Richthofen, a.k.a. The Red Baron, shoots down his 79th and 80th victims, his final victories before his death the following day.
1922 – The Soviet government creates South Ossetian Autonomous Oblast within Georgian SSR.
1945 – World War II: U.S. troops capture Leipzig, Germany, only to later cede the city to the Soviet Union.
  1945   – World War II: Führerbunker: On his 56th birthday Adolf Hitler makes his last trip to the surface to award Iron Crosses to boy soldiers of the Hitler Youth.
  1945   – Twenty Jewish children used in medical experiments at Neuengamme are killed in the basement of the Bullenhuser Damm school.
1946 – The League of Nations officially dissolves, giving most of its power to the United Nations.
1961 – Cold War: Failure of the Bay of Pigs Invasion of US-backed Cuban exiles against Cuba.
1968 – English politician Enoch Powell makes his controversial "Rivers of Blood" speech.
  1968   – South African Airways Flight 228 crashes near the Hosea Kutako International Airport in South West Africa (now Namibia), killing 123 people.
1972 – Apollo program: Apollo 16 lunar module, commanded by John Young and piloted by Charles Duke, lands on the moon.
1998 – Air France Flight 422 crashes after taking off from El Dorado International Airport in Bogotá, Colombia, killing all 53 people on board.
1999 – Columbine High School massacre: Eric Harris and Dylan Klebold kill 13 people and injure 24 others before committing suicide at Columbine High School in Columbine, Colorado.
2007 – Johnson Space Center shooting: William Phillips with a handgun barricades himself in NASA's Johnson Space Center in Houston, Texas before killing a male hostage and himself.
2008 – Danica Patrick wins the Indy Japan 300 becoming the first female driver in history to win an Indy car race.
2010 – The Deepwater Horizon drilling rig explodes in the Gulf of Mexico, killing eleven workers and beginning an oil spill that would last six months.
2012 – One hundred twenty-seven people are killed when a plane crashes in a residential area near the Benazir Bhutto International Airport near Islamabad, Pakistan.
2013 – A 6.6-magnitude earthquake strikes Lushan County, Ya'an, in China's Sichuan province, killing more than 150 people and injuring thousands.
2015 – Ten people are killed in a bomb attack on a convoy carrying food supplies to a United Nations compound in Garowe in the Somali region of Puntland.
2020 – For the first time in history, oil prices drop below zero.
2021 – State of Minnesota v. Derek Michael Chauvin: Derek Chauvin is found guilty of all charges in the murder of George Floyd by the Fourth Judicial District Court of Minnesota.

Births

Pre-1600
1494 – Johannes Agricola, German theologian and reformer (d. 1566)
1544 – Renata of Lorraine, Duchess consort of Bavaria (d. 1602)
1586 – Rose of Lima, Peruvian mystic and saint (d. 1617)

1601–1900
1633 – Emperor Go-Kōmyō of Japan (d. 1654)
1646 – Charles Plumier, French botanist and author (d. 1704)
1650 – William Bedloe, English spy (d. 1680)
1718 – David Brainerd, American missionary (d. 1747)
1723 – Cornelius Harnett, American merchant, farmer, and politician (d. 1781)
1727 – Florimond Claude, Comte de Mercy-Argenteau, Belgian-Austrian minister and diplomat (d. 1794)
1745 – Philippe Pinel, French physician and psychiatrist (d. 1826)
1748 – Georg Michael Telemann, German composer and theologian (d. 1831)
1808 – Napoleon III, French politician, 1st President of France (d. 1873)
1816 – Bogoslav Šulek, Croatian philologist, historian, and lexicographer (d. 1895)
1818 – Heinrich Göbel, German-American mechanic and engineer (d. 1893)
1826 – Dinah Craik, English author and poet (d. 1887)
1836 – Eli Whitney Blake, Jr., American scientist and academic (d. 1895)
1839 – Carol I of Romania, King of Romania (d. 1914)
1840 – Odilon Redon, French painter and illustrator (d. 1916)
1850 – Daniel Chester French, American sculptor, designed the Lincoln statue (d. 1931)
1851 – Alexander Dianin, Russian chemist (d. 1918)
  1851   – Siegmund Lubin, Polish-American businessman, founded the Lubin Manufacturing Company (d. 1923)
1860 – Justinien de Clary, French target shooter (d. 1933)
1871 – Sydney Chapman, English economist and civil servant (d. 1951)
1873 – James Harcourt, English character actor (d. 1951)
1875 – Vladimir Vidrić, Croatian poet and lawyer (d. 1909)
1879 – Paul Poiret, French fashion designer (d. 1944)
1882 – Holland Smith, American general (d. 1967)
1884 – Princess Beatrice of Saxe-Coburg and Gotha (d. 1966)
  1884   – Oliver Kirk, American boxer (d. 1960)
  1884   – Daniel Varoujan, Armenian poet and educator (d. 1915)
1889 – Albert Jean Amateau, Turkish rabbi, lawyer, and activist (d. 1996)
  1889   – Prince Erik, Duke of Västmanland (d. 1918)
  1889   – Marie-Antoinette de Geuser, French mystic (d. 1918)
  1889   – Adolf Hitler, Austrian-born German politician, Führer of Nazi Germany (d. 1945)
  1889   – Tonny Kessler, Dutch footballer (d. 1960)
1890 – Maurice Duplessis, Canadian lawyer and politician, 16th Premier of Quebec (d. 1959)
  1890   – Adolf Schärf, Austrian soldier and politician, 6th President of Austria (d. 1965)
1891 – Dave Bancroft, American baseball player and manager (d. 1972)
1893 – Harold Lloyd, American actor, comedian, and producer (d. 1971)
  1893   – Joan Miró, Spanish painter and sculptor (d. 1983)
1895 – Emile Christian, American trombonist and composer (d. 1973)
  1895   – Henry de Montherlant, French essayist, novelist, and dramatist (d. 1972)
1896 – Wop May, Canadian captain and pilot (d. 1952)
1899 – Alan Arnett McLeod, Canadian lieutenant, Victoria Cross recipient (d. 1918)

1901–present
1904 – Bruce Cabot, American actor (d. 1972)
1907 – Augoustinos Kantiotes, Greek bishop (d. 2010)
1908 – Lionel Hampton, American vibraphone player, pianist, bandleader, and actor (d. 2002)
1910 – Fatin Rüştü Zorlu, Turkish diplomat and politician (d. 1961)
1913 – Mimis Fotopoulos, Greek actor and poet (d. 1986)
  1913   – Willi Hennig, German biologist and entomologist (d. 1976)
1914 – Betty Lou Gerson, American actress (d. 1999)
1915 – Joseph Wolpe, South African psychotherapist and physician (d. 1997)
1916 – Nasiba Zeynalova, Azerbaijani actress (d. 2004)
1918 – Kai Siegbahn, Swedish physicist and academic, Nobel Prize laureate (d. 2007)
1919 – Richard Hillary, Australian lieutenant and pilot (d. 1943)
1920 – Frances Ames, South African neurologist, psychiatrist, and human rights activist (d. 2002)
  1920   – Clement Isong, Nigerian banker and politician, Governor of Cross River State (d. 2000)
  1920   – John Paul Stevens, American lawyer and jurist, Associate Justice of the Supreme Court of the United States (d. 2019)
1923 – Mother Angelica, American nun and broadcaster, founded Eternal Word Television Network (d. 2016)
  1923   – Irene Lieblich, Polish-American painter and illustrator (d. 2008)
  1923   – Tito Puente, American drummer and producer (d. 2000)
1924 – Nina Foch, Dutch-American actress (d. 2008)
  1924   – Leslie Phillips, English actor and producer (d. 2022)
  1924   – Guy Rocher, Canadian sociologist and academic
1925 – Ernie Stautner, German-American football player and coach (d. 2006)
  1925   – Elena Verdugo, American actress (d. 2017)
1927 – Bud Cullen, Canadian judge and politician, 1st Canadian Minister of Employment and Immigration (d. 2005)
  1927   – Phil Hill, American race car driver (d. 2008)
  1927   – K. Alex Müller, Swiss physicist and academic, Nobel Prize laureate (d. 2023)
1928 – Robert Byrne, American chess player and author (d. 2013)
  1928   – Johnny Gavin, Irish international footballer (d. 2007)
1929 – Harry Agganis, American baseball and football player (d. 1955)
  1929   – Bobby Hollander, American film director, actor, and magazine publisher (d. 2002)
1930 – Dwight Gustafson, American composer and conductor (d. 2014)
  1930   – Antony Jay, English director and screenwriter (d. 2016)
1931 – Michael Allenby, 3rd Viscount Allenby, English lieutenant and politician (d. 2014)
  1931   – John Eccles, 2nd Viscount Eccles, English businessman and politician
1932 – Myriam Bru, French actress
1933 – Kristaq Dhamo, Albanian actor and film director (d. 2022)
1936 – Lisa Davis, English-American actress
  1936   – Pauli Ellefsen, Faroese technician, surveyor, and politician, 6th Prime Minister of the Faroe Islands (d. 2012)
  1936   – Pat Roberts, American captain, journalist, and politician
1937 – Jiří Dienstbier, Czech journalist and politician, Czech Minister of Foreign Affairs (d. 2011)
  1937   – Antonios Kounadis, Greek discus thrower
  1937   – Harvey Quaytman, American painter and educator (d. 2002)
  1937   – George Takei, American actor
1938 – Betty Cuthbert, Australian sprinter (d. 2017)
  1938   – Manfred Kinder, German runner
  1938   – Eszter Tamási, Hungarian actress (d. 1991)
1939 – Elspeth Ballantyne, Australian actress
  1939   – Peter S. Beagle, American author and screenwriter
  1939   – Gro Harlem Brundtland, Norwegian physician and politician, 22nd Prime Minister of Norway
  1939   – Johnny Tillotson, American singer-songwriter
1940 – James Gammon, American actor (d. 2010)
1941 – Ryan O'Neal, American actor
1942 – Giles Henderson, English lawyer and academic
  1942   – Arto Paasilinna, Finnish journalist and author (d. 2018)
1943 – Alan Beith, English academic and politician
  1943   – John Eliot Gardiner, English conductor and director
  1943   – Edie Sedgwick, American model and actress (d. 1971)
1944 – Toivo Aare, Estonian journalist and author (d. 1999)
1945 – Michael Brandon, American actor and director
  1945   – Olga Karlatos, Greek actress and Bermudian lawyer
  1945   – Thein Sein, Burmese general and politician, 8th President of Burma
  1945   – Naftali Temu, Kenyan runner (d. 2003)
  1945   – Steve Spurrier, American football player and head coach, 1966 Heisman Trophy winner
1946 – Sandro Chia, Italian painter and sculptor
  1946   – Julien Poulin, Canadian actor, director, producer, and screenwriter
  1946   – Gordon Smiley, American race car driver (d. 1982)
1947 – Rita Dionne-Marsolais, Canadian economist and politician
  1947   – David Leland, English actor, director, and screenwriter
  1947   – Viktor Suvorov, Russian intelligence officer, historian, and author
1948 – Gregory Itzin, American actor (d. 2022)
  1948   – Matthias Kuhle, German geographer and academic (d. 2015)
1949 – Veronica Cartwright, English-American actress
  1949   – Toller Cranston, Canadian-Mexican figure skater and painter (d. 2015)
  1949   – Massimo D'Alema, Italian journalist and politician, 76th Prime Minister of Italy
  1949   – Jessica Lange, American actress
1950 – Steve Erickson, American author and critic
  1950   – Alexander Lebed, Russian general and politician (d. 2002)
  1950   – N. Chandrababu Naidu, Indian politician, 13th Chief Minister of Andhra Pradesh
1951 – Luther Vandross, American singer-songwriter and producer (d. 2005)
1952 – Louka Katseli, Greek economist and politician
1953 – Sebastian Faulks, English journalist and author
1955 – Donald Pettit, American engineer and astronaut
  1955   – Svante Pääbo, Swedish geneticist and Nobel Laureate 
1956 – Beatrice Ask, Swedish politician, Swedish Minister for Justice
  1956   – Peter Chelsom, English film director, writer, and actor
  1956   – Kakha Bendukidze, Georgian economist and politician (d. 2014)
1958 – Viacheslav Fetisov, Russian ice hockey player and coach
1960 – Debbie Flintoff-King, Australian hurdler and coach
1961 – Don Mattingly, American baseball player, coach, and manager
  1961   – Konstantin Lavronenko, Russian actor
1963 – Rachel Whiteread, English sculptor
1964 – John Carney, American football player
  1964   – Andy Serkis, English actor and director
  1964   – Rosalynn Sumners, American figure skater
1965 – Kostis Chatzidakis, Greek politician, Ministry of Economy, Infrastructure, Shipping and Tourism
  1965   – Léa Fazer, Swiss film director, screenwriter and actress
1966 – David Chalmers, Australian philosopher and academic
  1966   – David Filo, American businessman, co-founded Yahoo!
1967 – Mike Portnoy, American drummer and songwriter
1968 – Julia Morris, Australian entertainer
1969 – Will Hodgman, Australian politician, 45th Premier of Tasmania
1970 – Shemar Moore, American actor
1972 – Carmen Electra, American model and actress
1973 – Julie Powell, American food writer and memoirist (d. 2022)

Deaths

Pre-1600
 689 – Cædwalla, king of Wessex (b. 659)
767 – Taichō, Japanese monk (b. 682)
888 – Xi Zong, Chinese emperor (b. 862)
1099 – Peter Bartholomew (b. 1061)
1164 – Antipope Victor IV
1176 – Richard de Clare, 2nd Earl of Pembroke, English-Irish politician, Lord Chief Justice of Ireland (b. 1130)
1248 – Güyük Khan, Mongol ruler, 3rd Great Khan of the Mongol Empire (b. 1206)
1284 – Hōjō Tokimune, regent of Japan (b. 1251)
1314 – Pope Clement V (b. 1264)
1322 – Simon Rinalducci, Italian Augustinian friar
1502 – Mary of Looz-Heinsberg, Dutch noble (b. 1424)
1521 – Zhengde, Chinese emperor (b. 1491)
1534 – Elizabeth Barton, English nun and martyr (b. 1506)
1558 – Johannes Bugenhagen, German priest and theologian (b. 1485)

1601–1900
1643 – Christoph Demantius, German composer and poet (b. 1567)
1703 – Lancelot Addison, English clergyman and educator (b. 1632)
1769 – Chief Pontiac, American tribal leader (b. 1720)
1831 – John Abernethy, English surgeon and anatomist (b. 1764)
1873 – William Tite, English architect, designed the Royal Exchange (b. 1798)
1874 – Alexander H. Bailey, American lawyer, judge, and politician (b. 1817)
1881 – William Burges, English architect and designer (b. 1827)
1886 – Charles-François-Frédéric, marquis de Montholon-Sémonville, French general and diplomat, French ambassador to the United States (b. 1814)
1887 – Muhammad Sharif Pasha, Greek-Egyptian politician, 2nd Prime Minister of Egypt (b. 1826)
1899 – Joseph Wolf, German ornithologist and illustrator (b. 1820)

1901–present

1902 – Joaquim de Sousa Andrade, Brazilian poet and educator (b. 1833)
1912 – Bram Stoker, Anglo-Irish novelist and critic, created Count Dracula (b. 1847)
1918 – Karl Ferdinand Braun, German-American physicist and academic, Nobel Prize laureate (b. 1850)
1927 – Enrique Simonet, Spanish painter and educator (b. 1866)
1929 – Prince Henry of Prussia (b. 1862)
1931 – Sir Cosmo Duff-Gordon, 5th Baronet, Scottish-English fencer and businessman (b. 1862)
1932 – Giuseppe Peano, Italian mathematician and philosopher (b. 1858)
1935 – John Cameron, Scottish footballer and manager (b. 1872)
  1935   – Lucy, Lady Duff-Gordon, English fashion designer (b. 1863)
1942 – Jüri Jaakson, Estonian businessman and politician, 6th State Elder of Estonia (b. 1870)
1944 – Elmer Gedeon, American baseball player and pilot (b. 1917)
1945 – Erwin Bumke, Polish-German jurist and politician (b. 1874)
1946 – Mae Busch, Australian actress (b. 1891)
1947 – Christian X of Denmark (b. 1870)
1951 – Ivanoe Bonomi, Italian politician, 25th Prime Minister of Italy (b. 1873)
1961 – Ado Vabbe, Estonian painter (b. 1892)
1967 – Léo-Paul Desrosiers, Canadian journalist and author (b. 1896)
1968 – Rudolph Dirks, German-American illustrator (b. 1877)
1969 – Vjekoslav Luburić, Croatian Ustaše official and concentration camp administrator (b. 1914)
1980 – M. Canagaratnam, Sri Lankan politician (b. 1924)
1982 – Archibald MacLeish, American poet, playwright, and lawyer (b. 1892)
1986 – Sibte Hassan, Pakistani journalist, scholar, and activist (b. 1916)
1991 – Steve Marriott, English singer-songwriter and producer (b. 1947)
  1991   – Don Siegel, American director and producer (b. 1912) 
1992 – Marjorie Gestring, American springboard diver (b. 1922)
  1992   – Benny Hill, English comedian, actor, and screenwriter (b. 1924)
1993 – Cantinflas, Mexican actor, producer, and screenwriter (b. 1911)
1995 – Milovan Đilas, Yugoslav communist, politician, theorist and author (b. 1911)
1996 – Trần Văn Trà, Vietnamese general and politician (b. 1918)
1999 – Rick Rude, American professional wrestler (b. 1958)
2001 – Giuseppe Sinopoli, Italian conductor and composer (b. 1946)
2002 – Alan Dale, American singer (b. 1925)
2003 – Bernard Katz, German-English biophysicist and academic, Nobel Prize laureate (b. 1911)
2004 – Lizzy Mercier Descloux, French musician, singer-songwriter, composer, actress, writer and painter (b. 1956)
2005 – Fumio Niwa, Japanese journalist and author (b. 1904)
2007 – Andrew Hill, American pianist, composer, and bandleader (b. 1931)
  2007   – Michael Fu Tieshan, Chinese bishop (b. 1931)
2008 – Monica Lovinescu, Romanian journalist and author (b. 1923)
2010 – Dorothy Height, American educator and activist (b. 1912)
2011 – Tim Hetherington, English photographer and journalist (b. 1970)
2012 – Bert Weedon, English guitarist and songwriter (b. 1920)
2016 – Victoria Wood, British comedian, actress and writer (b. 1953)
2018 – Avicii, Swedish DJ and musician (b. 1989)
2021 – Idriss Déby, Chadian politician and military officer (b. 1952)
  2021   – Monte Hellman, American film director (b.1929)
  2021   – Les McKeown, Scottish pop singer (b. 1955)
2022 – Gavin Millar, Scottish film director (b. 1938)

Holidays and observances
 Christian feast day:
Agnes of Montepulciano
Beuno
Hugh of Anzy le Duc
Johannes Bugenhagen (Lutheran)
Marcellinus of Gaul (Embrun)
Blessed Oda of Brabant
Pope Anicetus
Theotimos
April 20 (Eastern Orthodox liturgics)
 420 (cannabis culture)
UN Chinese Language Day (United Nations)

References

External links

 BBC: On This Day
 
 Historical Events on April 20

Days of the year
April